Miguel Olivera (born 5 July 1946) is a Cuban former sprinter who competed in the 1968 Summer Olympics.

References

1946 births
Living people
Cuban male sprinters
Olympic athletes of Cuba
Athletes (track and field) at the 1968 Summer Olympics
Athletes (track and field) at the 1967 Pan American Games
Athletes (track and field) at the 1971 Pan American Games
Pan American Games competitors for Cuba
Central American and Caribbean Games gold medalists for Cuba
Competitors at the 1970 Central American and Caribbean Games
Central American and Caribbean Games medalists in athletics
20th-century Cuban people
21st-century Cuban people